Javier Jiménez Pérez  is a Puerto Rican politician and the current mayor of San Sebastián, Puerto Rico. Jiménez is affiliated with the New Progressive Party (PNP) and has served as mayor since 2005.

Education
Has a Bachelor's Degree in Business Administration with a concentration in Accounting from the University of Puerto Rico at Mayagüez.

Hurricane Maria
Hurricane Maria, on September 20, 2017, triggered numerous landslides in San Sebastián with the significant amount of rain that fell. The hurricane winds knocked the power out and the entire municipality was left in the dark, as was the rest or Puerto Rico.

Two weeks after the hurricane decimated the island, Jiménez noticed that help was not on the way. He decided that San Sebastián would not wait for the AEE brigades to come. He assembled an ad hoc team of volunteers, some who were retired AEE electricians and their mandate was to get the electrical power back up and running, for the people of  San Sebastián. They were able to restore 92% of the electricity within two months. A monument honoring the accomplishments of the Pepino Power Authority, as they were quickly named, was erected in Plaza de la Identidad Pepiniana in San Sebastián barrio-pueblo.

In early 2019, Jiménez received an Outstanding Achievement Award from the National Hurricane Center (NHC) for mitigating the power failure.

References

Living people
Mayors of places in Puerto Rico
New Progressive Party (Puerto Rico) politicians
People from San Sebastián, Puerto Rico
Year of birth missing (living people)